The 2021 Kategoria e Tretë was the 18th official season of the Albanian football fourth division since its establishment. The season began on 11 March 2021 and ended on 14 May 2021. There are 6 teams competing this season. Luftëtari and Murlani gained promotion to the 2021–22 Kategoria e Dytë. Luftëtari won their first Kategoria e Tretë title.

Changes from last season

Team changes

From Third Division
Promoted to Kategoria e Dytë:
 Bulqiza
 Labëria
 Valbona

Stadia by capacity and locations

League standings

Results

References

4
Albania
Kategoria e Tretë seasons